GridPoint is an American clean technology company based in Reston, Virginia, that provides energy management and sustainability services to enterprises and government agencies, such as electric utilities.

GridPoint services include building management systems, equipment-level submetering and monitoring hardware, software analytics, and related energy management services.

History and growth 

GridPoint was founded in 2003 by Peter L. Corsell. Through its early growth and into 2009, GridPoint's Smart Grid Platform provided an intelligent network for utilities to integrate load measurement and control devices, energy storage technologies, and renewable energy sources into the electric grid.

In 2009, the company began utilising the data and analytics research and knowledge from its utility-facing smart grid technologies to develop tools to assist large energy consumers, particularly in the enterprise and government sectors, in managing their energy consumption.

Later that year, GridPoint acquired ADMMicro, a developer of energy management systems for the commercial and industrial (C&I) sector and Lixar, a cloud-based energy management software technology company.

In 2013, former Berkshire Hathaway executive Todd Raba joined GridPoint as CEO. Raba had previously run the Berkshire Hathaway companies Johns Manville and MidAmerican Energy Company.

In 2016, Mark Danzenbaker became GridPoint's CEO. he had been with GridPoint since 2009.

In 2018, GridPoint partnered with Shell and Sparkfund to launch a new smart building subscription solution for commercial businesses.

In October 2019, GridPoint announced an investment by Hannon Armstrong which allows the company to offer its energy management platform as an all-inclusive service, requiring zero capital down with a monthly pricing structure. 

GridPoint has raised over funds from investors including Goldman Sachs, Shell, Fortress Investment Group, New Enterprise Associates, I Squared Capital, QVT Financial, TOMS Capital, Twenty First Century Utilities, and Kensington Capital Partners.

Technology and services 
GridPoint's integrated energy management solution includes hardware, software and services that collect data about equipment-level energy consumption and building environmental conditions, aggregate and analyze that data and then communicate what actions can be taken to reduce energy consumption and carbon emissions, improve operational efficiency and capital utilization and help ensure business continuity.

Energy management hardware 

GridPoint's real-time controllers manage lighting schedules and HVAC (heating, ventilation and air conditioning) temperature setpoints across a network of facilities. Equipment-level submeters  measure circuit-level power consumption for equipment such as individual HVAC units, chiller boiler systems, lighting, refrigeration, kitchen equipment, plug loads and signage and monitoring devices collect environmental data such as temperature, humidity and  levels. Captured data is then fed into the GridPoint Energy Manager software platform.

Energy management software

GridPoint's energy management software platform, GridPoint Energy Manager, is a cloud-based data aggregation and analytics service that presents equipment-level energy consumption and building environmental information through SaaS-based dashboards, reports and alarms.  The software platform can be used with either GridPoint equipment or third-party hardware via open, standards-based public interfaces. The software platform also includes demand response functionality and distributed energy resources integration.

Energy management services

GridPoint's energy management services include energy advisory services, advanced reporting, custom savings analyses, alarm management, facility triage, equipment diagnoses and training.

Utility solutions

GridPoint's current utility solutions include enterprise energy management and submetering systems to support utilities' commercial and industrial customers  by providing information about energy consumption patterns and load and storage management solutions that capture and dispatch energy by storage assets located in a utility's transmission and distribution system.  For residential utility customers, GridPoint provides software-based dashboards that provide information about energy consumption, predicted energy usage and carbon impact.

GridPoint was designated as a 2008 Technology Pioneer by the World Economic Forum.

GridPoint's institutional investors include Goldman Sachs and New Enterprise Associates (NEA).

See also 
 Plugless Power

References

External links 
 

Energy companies of the United States
Energy conservation in the United States
Software companies based in Virginia
Companies based in Arlington County, Virginia
Software companies of the United States